"There's No Going Back" is a song by Australian rock band Sick Puppies, released as the lead single from their fourth studio album Connect.

Music video
The band is shown performing in the desert along with ghost version of themselves. The later part of the video recreates the cover of the band's album Connect where their ghost versions are being hoisted in the air while holding an umbrella.

Charts

Weekly charts

Year-end charts

References

Sick Puppies songs
2013 songs
Song recordings produced by Rock Mafia
Virgin Records singles
Songs written by Tim James (musician)
Songs written by Antonina Armato
Songs written by Desmond Child
Songs written by Shimon Moore
Songs written by Emma Anzai